This is a list of Christian religious houses in Schleswig-Holstein in Germany, including Hamburg and Lübeck, extant and non-extant, and including houses of both men and women. All religious houses were suppressed during the Protestant Reformation in the 16th century, with the exception of four former nunneries (Itzehoe, Preetz, Uetersen and St. John's, Schleswig), which became Protestant collegiate foundations for noblewomen, and still survive today.

See also
List of Christian monasteries in Brandenburg
List of Christian monasteries in Mecklenburg-Vorpommern
List of Christian monasteries in North Rhine-Westphalia
List of Christian monasteries in Saxony
List of Christian monasteries in Saxony-Anhalt
List of Christian monasteries in Denmark

Notes

Sources
 Klöster in Schleswig-Holstein 
 Klöster, Stifte und Konvente in Schleswig-Holstein und Hamburg 

 
Schleswig-Holstein
Mon